Propagation graphs are a mathematical modelling method for radio propagation channels. A propagation graph is a signal flow graph in which vertices represent transmitters, receivers or scatterers. Edges in the graph model propagation conditions between vertices. Propagation graph models were initially developed by Troels Pedersen, et al. for multipath propagation in scenarios with multiple scattering, such as indoor radio propagation. It has later been applied in many other scenarios.

Mathematical definition 
A propagation graph is a simple directed graph  with vertex set  and edge set .

The vertices models objects in the propagation scenario. The vertex set  is split into three disjoint sets as 
 where   is the set of transmitters,  
 is the set of receivers and 
 is the set of objects named  "scatterers".

The edge set  models the propagation models propagation conditions between vertices. Since  is assumed simple,  and an edge may be identified by a pair of vertices as 
In a propagation graph, transmitters cannot have incoming edges and receivers cannot have outgoing edges.

Two propagation rules are assumed
 A vertex sums the signals impinging via its ingoing edges and remits a scaled version it via the outgoing edges.

The definition of the vertex gain scaling and the edge transfer functions can be adapted to accommodate particular scenarios and should be defined in order to use the model in simulations. A variety of such definitions have been considered for different propagation graph models in the published literature. 

The edge transfer functions (in the Fourier domain) can be grouped into transfer matrices as
  the direct propagation from transmitters to receivers
  transmitters to scatterers 
  scatterers to receivers
  scatterers to scatterers,
where  is the frequency variable.

Transfer function 
The transfer function  of a propagation graph forms an infinite series

The transfer function is a Neumann series of operators. Alternatively, it can be viewed pointwise in frequency as a geometric series of matrices. This observation yields a closed form expression for the transfer function as

The transfer function account for propagation paths irrespective of the number of 'bounces'.
 
The series is similar to the Born series from multiple scattering theory.

The impulse responses  are obtained by inverse Fourier transform of

Partial transfer function 
Closed form expressions are available for partial sums, i.e. by considering only some of the terms in the transfer function. The partial transfer function for signal components propagation via at least  and at most  interactions is defined as
 where

Here  denotes the number of interactions or the bouncing order.

The partial transfer function is then 

Special cases:
 : Full transfer function.
 : Inderect term only. 
 : Error term due to an  -bounce truncation.

One application of partial transfer functions is in hybrid models, where propagation graphs are employed to model part of the response (usually the higher-order interactions).

Propagation graph models 
The propagation graph methodology have been applied in various settings to create radio channel models. Such a model is referred to as a propagation graph model.  Such models have been derived for scenarios including 
 Unipolarized inroom channels. The initial propagation graph models  were derived for unipolarized inroom channels.
 In  a polarimetric propagation graph model is developed for the inroom propagation scenario. 
For terrestrial communications, where relative velocity of objects are limited, the channel may be assumed quasi-static and the static model may be applied at each time step. 
 In a number of works including  propagation graphs have been integrated into ray-tracing models to enable simulation of reverberation phenomena. Such models are referred to as hybrid models. 
 Complex environments including outdoor-to-indoor cases. can be studied by taking advantage of the special structure of propagation graphs for these scenarios. Computation methods for obtaining responses for very complex environments have been developed in 
 The graph model methodology has been used to make spatially consistent MIMO channel models.
 Several propagation graph models have been published for high-speed train communications.

Calibration of propagation graph models 
To calibrate a propagation graph model, its parameters should be set to reasonable values. Different approaches can be taken.
Certain parameters can be derived from simplified geometry of the room. In particular, reverberation time can be computed via room electromagnetics. Alternatively, the parameters can ben set according to measurement data using inference techniques such as method of moments (statistics), approximate Bayesian computation., or deep neural networks

Related radio channel model types 
The method of propagation graph modeling is related to other methods. Noticeably,   
 Multiple scattering theory 
 Radiosity
 Ray tracing
 Geometry-based stochastic channel models (GBSCM)

References 

Mathematical modeling